Pirates With Attitudes (PWA) was a major international warez release group between 1992 and 2000. The group was established by two former International Network of Crackers members known by the pseudonyms Orion and BarManager. PWA was also very well known during the tail end of the BBS-era for their development of modifications and enhancements ("mods") for the PCBoard BBS software.

On May 4, 2000, the United States Department of Justice released a press report stating that conspiracy and copyright infringement charges had been brought against several members of PWA under the NET Act (No Electronic Theft Act). The day after the DOJ's report, PWA released a .nfo file officially announcing their retirement. PWA was one of the first groups ever to be prosecuted under this act of law.

Members
Alleged members of Pirates with Attitudes according to U.S. Department of Justice:
 Robin Rothberg, aka "Marlenus," (9/11/67) 32, of Newburyport, Massachusetts (pleaded guilty)
 Mark Veerboken, aka "Shiffie," of Belgium
 Steven Ahnen, aka "Code3," (4/13/58) 42, of Sarasota, Florida (pleaded guilty)
 Christian Morley, aka "Mercy" (4/13/73) 27, of Salem, Massachusetts (convicted)
 Justin Robbins, aka "Warlock," (2/10/76), 24, of Lake Station, Indiana (pleaded guilty)
 Jason Slater, aka "Technic," (4/28/70) 30, of Sunnyvale, California (pleaded guilty)
 Todd Veillette, aka "Gizmo," (11/21/59) 40, of Oakdale, Connecticut (pleaded guilty)
 Thomas Oliver, aka "RAMBONE," (7/14/65) 34, of Aurora, Illinois (pleaded guilty)
 Mark Stone, aka "Stoned," (3/24/66) 34, of California (pleaded guilty)
 Dionne, aka "akasha", of West Palm Beach, Florida (pleaded guilty)
 Chowdery, real name unknown
 James Tinner, aka inspector gadget, Spokane WA

References
 U.S. INDICTS 17 IN ALLEGED INTERNATIONAL SOFTWARE PIRACY CONSPIRACY- Archive of US DoJ website posting 
  "Pirates with Attitude (PWA) is a group organized and dedicated to making copyrighted software available over the Internet."
 
 
 
 
 348 F.3d 666: United States of America, Plaintiff-appellee, v. Jason Slater and Christian Morley, Defendants-appellants
 

Warez groups